Kiira Motors Corporation or KMC is a State Enterprise in Uganda established to champion the Development of the Domestic Automotive Value Chain for job and wealth creation and commercialize the Kiira Electric Vehicle Project. The Equity Partners are the Government of the Republic of Uganda represented by the Ministry of Science, Technology and Innovation, Office of the President holding 96% of the initial stock and Makerere University holding 4%.

Africa's first electric vehicle was developed under the Kiira Electric Vehicle Project in 2011. KMC developed Africa's first hybrid vehicle, the Kiira EVS, in 2014 and Africa's first solar electric bus, the Kayoola Solar Bus in 2016.

KMC's market entry products are the Kayoola EVS a Fully Electric Low Floor City Bus with a range of 300 kilometers on a full charge and the Kayoola Coach, a premium highway coach available in both electric and diesel powertrains.

History
The KMC journey dates back to 2007; evolving from an extra-curricular activity under the auspices of then Makerere University Faculty of Technology, to a university curricular activity and later a mainstream national initiative for automotive manufacturing. In 2007, a global consortium of over 31 universities and colleges across the world took part in a Vehicle Design Summit (VDS) to design and bring to market a 5-Seater plug-in hybrid electric vehicle, the Vision 200, targeting the Indian market. Under the United States-based Massachusetts Institute of Technology led three-year project, Uganda's Makerere University was the only participant from Africa. The team from the Faculty of Technology now College of Engineering, Design, Art and Technology was responsible for design and integration of the Low Power Electronics and Data Networking Systems. Given the experience in building the Vision 200, other global experiences through collaborations, and best practices benchmarking, the Makerere team resolved to embark on a project aimed at designing and building a vehicle in Uganda.

The Center for Research in Transport Technologies (CRTT) was then conceived under Makerere University in December 2008 and approved as part of the University Structures effective 1 January 2011. The strategic goal of CRTT was to advance research and innovation in transportation technologies on land, air and sea with specific emphasis on green mobility solutions for Africa. The Kiira EV Project was the first project implemented under CRTT. The Kiira EV, Africa's first electric vehicle, was completed by the team and launched by Yoweri Museveni, the President of the Republic of Uganda, on 24 November 2011.
The successful execution of the Kiira EV Project led to the establishment of the Kiira Motors Project as a government initiative for Automotive Industry Development aimed at Establishing a Vehicle Plant in Uganda. The Kiira Motors Project started the Kiira Vehicle Technology Innovation Program through which the Kiira EV SMACK, the first Electric Hybrid Vehicle designed and built in Africa, was developed and unveiled at a very high-profile event at the Kenyatta International Convention Centre in Nairobi, Kenya in November 2014.
The team then designed and built the Kayoola Solar Bus, the first Electric Solar Bus designed and built in Africa. The Kayoola Solar Bus was launched by Yoweri Museveni on 16 February 2016 at the Kampala Serena Hotel.

Kiira Motors conducted a Pre-Investment Analysis (The KMC Business Case) to affirm the viability of vision Vehicles Made in Uganda. This informed the development of the Kiira Motors Corporation Business Strategy and subsequently Business Plan. The KMC Pre-Investment Analysis (Business Case) was launched by the Uganda Prime Minister Ruhakana Rugunda on 7 December 2015 at the President's Office Conference Hall.

Commercial Production
Cabinet of Uganda sitting on Monday 9 April 2018 at Statehouse Entebbe approved the roadmap for the Commercialization of the Kiira Electric Vehicle Project. This is to be undertaken in a phased manner with the market-entry point being assembly of vehicles (including electric vehicles) in partnership with reputable vehicle manufacturers. Cabinet approved a Seed Fund of US$40 Million (USh 143.7 Billion) over a period of four years starting in the Financial Year 2018/19 with an allocation of USh 24 Billion under the Ministry of Science, Technology and Innovation. The decision was facilitated by a comprehensive appraisal and approval of a Feasibility Study for Setting Up and Operating the Kiira Vehicle Plant by the Ministry of Finance, Planning and Economic Development. Cabinet also authorised the Minister of Science, Technology and Innovation to put in place the necessary Institutional Framework for the Commercialization of the Kiira Electric Vehicle Project and mandated the Ministry of Science, Technology and Innovation to establish and oversee the project governance and management structures.

Kiira Vehicle Plant
The government of Uganda, acting through the Uganda Investment Authority (UIA), allocated 100 acres for the establishment of the Kiira Vehicle Plant, located at the Jinja Industrial and Business Park, Plot No. 701, Block 2 Kagogwa Village, Mawoito Parish, Kakira Town Council, Jinja District.

Kiira Motors Corporation and National Enterprise Corporation (NEC) signed a Memorandum of Understanding for Construction of the Kiira Vehicle Plant Start-Up Facilities (Phase I) at the Jinja Industrial and Business Park based on the Force Account Mechanism provided for under Section 95(A) of the PPDA  Act, 2003 (as amended). This was subsequent to clearance of the MOU by the Solicitor General.  The Kiira Vehicle Plant Site was handed over to NEC on 18 January 2019, who deployed security and commenced work on 11 February 2019. Construction is expected to take two and a half (2.5) Years with completion slated for June 2021.

The Scope of Work for NEC includes: Site Clearance; Construction of a  perimeter fence  and Two Gates; Excavation of a  Open Channel along the Western Boundary; Construction of the Assembly Shop, Offices, R&D Space, Materials Storage Areas, Overhead Water Reservoir, Container Yards, Finished Vehicle Park Yard, and Plant Monument; Construction and Installation of Servicing Facilities including the Plant Campus Circulation Roads, Power Distribution, Water Distribution, I.T Network Backbone, Drainage and Waste (Water and Solid) Management Systems; and defects liability period shall be for 12 months commencing on the date of Practical Completion of the Project.

Establishment of the Kiira Vehicle Plant is expected to catalyse investment by small and medium enterprises in the manufacture of vehicle parts, components and autonomy systems (Brake pads, seats, bolts and nuts, bumpers, vehicle electronics, navigation system, among others). Kiira Motors Corporation has developed a roadmap for the Domestic Manufacture of Auto-Parts in Uganda and secured accreditation from PPDA for an alternative system for procurement of Auto-Parts Suppliers providing for sample parts development and accreditation of the production part manufacturing system.

Establishment of the Kiira Vehicle Plant is projected to increase demand for the utilization of Uganda's natural resources such as steel from iron ore deposits; plastics from oil and gas, lithium ion batteries from graphite, lithium and cobalt deposits, vehicle upholstery and interior padding from cotton and leather, glass from silica and sand among others.

The Kiira Vehicle Plant's contribution to employment in Uganda is estimated at 940 jobs from the Start-Up Investment. The full-scale plant operation is estimated to create over 2,000 direct jobs and 12,000 indirect jobs.

The Kiira Vehicle Plant start-up Facilities will have an installed capacity of 5,000 vehicles annually.

In January 2020, the Daily Monitor newspaper reported that the Kayoola electric buses were as of then, available for sale to the public. KMC plans to manufacture 5,000 electric vehicles annually, beginning in July 2021. The manufacturer plans to procure up to 90 percent of the components in Uganda. It is being assisted by CHTC Motor Company, a subsidiary of the state-owned Sinomach Automobile Company. The long-term plan is to reduce air pollution in Uganda's capital, Kampala.

In August 2021, the progress of construction of the manufacturing plant was reported at 85 percent, with completion expected in the fourth quarter of calendar year 2021. At that time, production of motor vehicles was expected to start during the first half of 2022.

Yoweri Kaguta Museveni the President of the Republic of Uganda laid the Foundation Stone for the Kiira Vehicle Plant on 14 August 2021. The President at the event directed that there will no longer be any importation of fully built buses into Uganda.

In May 2022, the Ugandan Finance Ministry released the final Ush159 billion ($42 million) of the government's Ush218 billion ($58 million) investment package. This set the stage for completion of the manufacturing plan and the beginning of commercial production anticipated in June 2023.

Products

Kayoola EVS 
The Kayoola EVS is the market-entry product of Kiira Motors Corporation. The Kayoola EVS is a Fully Electric, Low Floor City Bus specifically designed for Urban Mass Transportation. At full charge, the Kayoola EVS has a range of up to 300 kilometers making it capable of handling the daily duty cycle. With a sitting capacity of up to 90 passengers.

The Kayoola EVS buses were used to offer Airport Transfer Services between Entebbe International Airport and Munyonyo Commonwealth Resort for delegates during the EU-Uganda Business Forum in March 2020. The buses have also undertaken the following exhibition drills and select shuttle services in Uganda:

 Transportation of Uganda Government Communication Officers from Ministry of Science, Technology and Innovation Offices in Kampala to the Kiira Vehicle Plant Site in Jinja covering a distance of over 230 kilometers;
 Transportation of the Rt. Hon. Speaker of Parliament of Uganda from the Source of the Nile Bridge to the Kiira Vehicle Plant Site in Jinja covering a distance of over 20 kilometers;
 Transportation of Delegates for the Uganda Europe Business Forum between Entebbe International Airport and Commonwealth Resort, Munyonyo in March 2020;
 Transportation of Uganda Civil Aviation Authority Staff between Kampala and Entebbe International Airport.

Kayoola Coach 

The Kayoola Coach is an intercity bus in Africa that is available in both Electric and Diesel variations. The Kayoola Diesel Coach is powered by a 6-cylinder turbo charged inter cooled Cummins engine, providing over 375 horsepower, and able to achieve a top speed of 140 km/hr.

Kiira EVS 
The Kiira EVS, a vehicle designed and Built by Kiira Motors Corporation, is a four-seater executive vehicle built off the Kiira EV SMACK platform. The Kiira EVS has undertaken a nationwide tour in excess of 3,650 kilometers in Eastern, Northern and Western Uganda with exhibitions in Masaka, Mbarara, Kabale, Kisoro, Kibaale, Bushenyi, Jinja, Kampala, Pakwach, Nebbi, Arua, Koboko, Oraba, Gulu, Kitgum, Lira, Soroti, Katakwi, Moroto, Mbale, Iganga along with a grand expo at the Africa Now Summit 2019.

Awards
KMC was recognized for the initiatives in Green Mobility by Frost & Sullivan with the 2016 Frost & Sullivan Visionary Innovation Leadership Award in Sustainable Mobility.

KMC was awarded as the African Company of the Year in the 2021 African Business Leadership Awards.

Bulamu Ventilator
In April 2020, Makerere University, in close collaboration with KMC, ResilientAfrica Network, and in partnership with the Ministry of Science, Technology and Innovation started the development of an open design low-cost medical ventilator, called the Bulamu Ventilator, to fill the critical need for ventilators for Uganda and the region, in response to COVID-19. Once the ventilator is developed, tested and optimally operational, the consortium will develop capacity for its mass production. The ventilator will be applied beyond COVID-19 to other severe conditions that require assisted breathing. This technology will substantially improve the capacity for critical care in Uganda.

As of 30 June 2020, the consortium had undertaken Phase I of the development of the Bulamu Ventilator which included Technology Assessment & Open Design Adaptation, Systems Design and Specification, Development of Initial Engineering Prototype for Proof of Functionality and Development of Three (3) Engineering and Validation Prototypes.

The raw materials for the machine are majorly sourced within Uganda. It is expected to retail at about US$3,000, compared to US$25,000 for an imported medical ventilator.

Governance
In May 2021, a new 13-person board of directors was installed. The board members of the company are as listed in the table below.

Customers
Starting in September 2022, Kiira Motor Corporation began supplying both electric and diesel buses to Tondeka Metro Bus Service (TMBS), to establish a public rapid bus service in the Kampala metropolitan area. Starting with five diesel units, a total of 30 units are expected in 2022. Another 600 buses are planned to be delivered in 2023. The first phase of the TMBS system is planned to absorb 980 buses, with future stages requiring more units.

References

External links
Uganda’s electric bus coming in December As of 26 November 2019.
Website of Kiira Motors Corporation
Kiira and Mobius: A long way to go
Dignited: Kayola specifications

Motor vehicle manufacturers of Uganda
Companies based in Kampala
Government-owned companies of Uganda
Vehicle manufacturing companies established in 2014
2014 establishments in Uganda
Jinja, Uganda